Daniel Marinho Gonçalves (born 22 March 1995) is a Portuguese Canadian footballer who plays for Merelinense as a goalkeeper.

References

External links

Stats and profile at LPFP 

1995 births
Living people
Portuguese footballers
Association football goalkeepers
Liga Portugal 2 players
Varzim S.C. players